Johan Meimer (19 June 1904 – 10 December 1944) was an Estonian athlete. He competed in the men's javelin throw and the men's decathlon at the 1928 Summer Olympics. He was a forest brother and killed during the World War II by Soviets.

References

External links
 

1904 births
1944 deaths
People from Kehtna Parish
People from the Governorate of Estonia
Athletes (track and field) at the 1928 Summer Olympics
Estonian male javelin throwers
Estonian decathletes
Olympic athletes of Estonia
Military personnel killed in World War II
Estonian people executed by the Soviet Union